Winning Streak may refer to:
 Winning streak, an uninterrupted sequence of success in a game, sport, or other endeavor
 Winning Streak (film), a 2012 Spanish comedy-drama film
 Winning Streak (American game show)
 Winning Streak (Irish game show)
 "Winning Streak", a 2015 song by Glen Hansard from Didn't He Ramble
 "Winning Streak", a 2015 song by Ashley Monroe from The Blade

See also